The greenfinches are small passerine birds in the genus Chloris in the subfamily Carduelinae within the Fringillidae. The species have a Eurasian distribution except for the European greenfinch, which also occurs in North Africa.

These finches all have large conical bills and yellow patches on the wing feathers.

The greenfinches were formerly placed in the genus Carduelis. Molecular phylogenetic studies showed that the greenfinches form a monophyletic group that is not closely related to the species in Carduelis and instead is sister to a clade containing the desert finch (Rhodospiza obsoleta) and the Socotra golden-winged grosbeak (Rhynchostruthus socotranus). The greenfinches were therefore moved to the resurrected genus Chloris which had originally been introduced by the French naturalist Georges Cuvier in 1800 with the European greenfinch as the type species. The name is from Ancient Greek khloris, the European greenfinch, from khloros, "green".

Extant species
The genus contains six species:

Fossil species
 
 Trias greenfinch (Chloris triasi) - Holocene of La Palma, the Canary Islands, Spain
 Slender-billed greenfinch (Chloris aurelioi) - Holocene of Tenerife, the Canary Islands, Spain

References

 
Taxa named by Georges Cuvier